Sir Edward Irby, 1st Baronet (31 July 1676 – 11 November 1718) was an English politician who sat in the House of Commons of England from 1702 until 1708 when following the Act of Union 1707 it had become the House of Commons of Great Britain.

Irby was the eldest son of Anthony Irby and his wife Mary Stringer, daughter of John Stringer. He was the grandson of Sir Anthony Irby. In 1702, he was elected Member of Parliament for Boston, representing the constituency until 1708. On 13 April 1704, he was created a baronet, of Whaplode and Boston, in the County of Lincolnshire.

Irby married Dorothy Paget, only daughter of Hon. Henry Paget, second son of William Paget, 5th Baron Paget in 1706, and by her he had a son and a daughter.

Irby died intestate at King's Cliffe, Northamptonshire and was buried at Whaplode, Lincolnshire. He was succeeded in the baronetcy by his only son William, later raised to the Peerage of Great Britain as Baron Boston.

References

1676 births
1718 deaths
Baronets in the Baronetage of England
Members of the Parliament of Great Britain for English constituencies
English MPs 1702–1705
English MPs 1705–1707
British MPs 1707–1708